Sophora tetraptera, commonly known as large-leaved kōwhai, grows naturally only in the central east of the North Island in New Zealand. S. tetraptera has larger more widely spaced leaves than the other seven species of kōwhai.

Etymology
The generic name, Sophora derives from the Arabic, sophora (any tree with pea-flowers), and the specific epithet, tetraptera, comes from the Greek (four-winged) and refers to the fruits.

References

External links
Sophora tetraptera (Friends of Te Henui)
The Endeavour Botanical Illustrations: Sophora tetraptera (Painting by Frederick Polydore Nodder, specimen from Teoneroa, Tegadu Bay, Tolaga Bay)

tetraptera
 Trees of New Zealand
 Plants described in 1780
 Endemic flora of New Zealand